is a Japanese screenwriter. Active in various fields (and credited through various pseudonyms) since he was 17 years old, the most popular works he has helmed have been in anime and tokusatsu: Dangaioh, Angel Cop, Ultraman: Towards the Future, Martian Successor Nadesico, Love Hina, The Twelve Kingdoms, Fullmetal Alchemist, Kamen Rider Blade, GoGo Sentai Boukenger and Concrete Revolutio.

Most of his anime work has been in adaptations which, when he is the main writer, feature significant deviations from the source materials' trajectory. Among those based on original concepts, 7 titles were conceived, wholly or partly, by him; he also had one manga he had written adapted to animation.

Works
Works that are derivatives of titles Aikawa also worked on in other mediums are in bold.

Anime

Best episodes
Asked in 2018 to name what he felt were the ten best anime episodes he'd ever written, Aikawa listed the following:

 Urotsukidōji: Legend of the Demon Womb
 Martian Successor Nadesico episode 13: 
 Oh! Edo Rocket episode 6: 
 The Twelve Kingdoms episode 11: 
 Brave Police J-Decker episode 17: 

 Love Hina Christmas Special - Silent Eve
 Clockwork Fighters Hiwou's War episode 25: 
 Vampire Princess Miyu episode 2: 
 Simoun episode 4: 
 Sonic Soldier Borgman episode 13:

Live-action

Books

Among other shorts Aikawa wrote for magazines and never republished are pieces set in franchises he'd worked on elsewhere like Dangaioh and Neo Ranga (intended to become a full novel, which never came to be); as well as original stories. Novels for Vampire Princess Miyu, The Hakkenden and Martian Successor Nadesico were announced, but also never came to be.

Light novels based on anime Aikawa created, but which he had no direct involvement on, also exist:

Manga

Various manga adaptations of anime Aikawa co-created, each with varying degrees of adherence to their source materials, also exist, but he did not work on them directly:
  (3 volumes) by J-ta Yamada (originated by the Un-Go Production Committee, supervised by Bones and the Un-Go Production Committee) on Kadokawa Shoten's 
  (1 volume);  by Aki Kanehiro, art by Mutsuki Nago, manga original character designs by Noizi Ito; on Kodansha's Monthly Shōnen Sirius

Audio dramas

At one point in the late '80s/early '90s he was assigned to write an audio drama adaptation of Rokudenashi Blues, but struggled with the material and had to give up the job. Aikawa wanted to make a Concrete Revolutio audio drama, but that did not happen due to budgetary reasons

Video games

Notes

References

External links
 

1965 births
Anime screenwriters
Living people
Japanese screenwriters
People from Tokyo